Taqah is a province and coastal town in the Dhofar governorate, in southwestern Oman.

History
In 1908, J.G. Lorimer recorded Rakhyut in his Gazetteer of the Persian Gulf, noting its location as the easternmost village in the Dhufar Proper two miles west of Khor Rori and 20 miles west of Mirbat. He wrote:

Places of interest
 Approx. 2 km after the western entrance to the town there is a mosque named Shaikh Al-Afeef (Arabic: الشيخ العفيف). In its cemetery Mazoon al-Mashani, the mother of Sultan Qaboos, is buried. Under identical marble gravestones an uncle and a grandfather of the Sultans are buried.

See also
Dhofar Rebellion

References

External links

Oman Observer

Populated places in the Dhofar Governorate